Magliani is an Italian surname. Notable people with the surname include:

 Agostino Magliani (1824–1891), Italian financier
 Francesca Magliani (1845–?), Italian painter

See also
 Magli (surname)

Surnames of Italian origin